Sarab Sorkheh Ahmadabad (also Romanized as Sarāb Sorkheh Aḩmadābād; also known as Aḩmadābād) is a village in Qaleh-ye Mozaffari Rural District, in the Central District of Selseleh County, Lorestan Province, Iran. At the 2006 census, its population was 264, in 55 families.

References 

Towns and villages in Selseleh County